SS Joseph R. Lamar was a Liberty ship built in the United States during World War II. She was named after Joseph R. Lamar, an Associate Justice of the Supreme Court of the United States.

Construction
Joseph R. Lamar was laid down on 1 August 1942, under a Maritime Commission (MARCOM) contract, MC hull 1491, by J.A. Jones Construction, Brunswick, Georgia; sponsored by Mrs. Ellis Armain, and launched on 29 April 1943.

History
She was allocated to Agwilines, Inc., on 17 June 1943. On 8 October 1948, she was laid up in the National Defense Reserve Fleet in Mobile, Alabama. On 28 October 1960, she was sold to Pinto Island Metals Company for $56,000, for scrapping, she was delivered on 8 December 1960.

References

Bibliography

 
 
 
 
 

 

Liberty ships
Ships built in Brunswick, Georgia
1943 ships
Mobile Reserve Fleet